Pimelea decora, commonly known as Flanders poppy, is a species of flowering plant in the family Thymelaeaceae and is native to central Queensland. It is a woody perennial herb with egg-shaped or elliptic leaves and hairy, red and cream-coloured flowers.

Description
Flowering occurs throughout the year.

Taxonomy
Pimelea decora  was first formally described in 1928 by Karel Domin in his Bibliotheca Botanica, from specimens he collected near Hughenden in 1910. The specific epithet (decora) means "beautiful".

Distribution and habitat
Flanders poppy grows in grassland, often in rocky soil and is found in central Queensland, mainly south-east of Hughenden. Domin noted that the species is very poisonous to livestock.

References

decora
Flora of Queensland
Malvales of Australia
Plants described in 1928
Taxa named by Karel Domin